Patrick le Rolland (15 May 1943 – 28 August 2014) was a French equestrian. He competed in the individual dressage event at the 1972 Summer Olympics.

References

External links
 

1943 births
2014 deaths
French male equestrians
French dressage riders
Olympic equestrians of France
Equestrians at the 1972 Summer Olympics